Tycho G has been proposed as the surviving binary companion star of the SN 1572 supernova event. The star is located about  light-years away in the constellation Cassiopeia. It is a subgiant, similar to the Sun in temperature, but more evolved and luminous.

Origin of the name
The supernova SN 1572 is often called "Tycho's supernova", named after Tycho Brahe who observed the "new star" in 1572. The postfix "G" originates from the candidate companion stars considered in a 2004 study, labelled Tycho A to Tycho V.

Evidence for companion hypothesis
Tycho G is travelling away from us at nearly 80 km/s, much faster than the mean velocity of other stars in its stellar neighbourhood. It matches the properties of some models for the pre-supernova star system, although other studies exclude it.

See also
 List of supernova remnants

References

External links
 Discovery of the binary companion of Tycho Brahe's supernova
 https://jumk.de/astronomie/special-stars/tycho-g.shtml

Supernova remnants
Cassiopeia (constellation)
G-type subgiants